Willi Maier (born 12 September 1948) is a German middle-distance runner. He competed in the 3000 metres steeplechase at the 1972 Summer Olympics and the 1976 Summer Olympics.

References

1948 births
Living people
Athletes (track and field) at the 1972 Summer Olympics
Athletes (track and field) at the 1976 Summer Olympics
German male middle-distance runners
German male steeplechase runners
Olympic athletes of West Germany
Place of birth missing (living people)
20th-century German people